Steve J. Morse (born July 28, 1954) is an American guitarist, best known as the founder of the Dixie Dregs and as the guitarist for Deep Purple from 1994 to 2022. Morse has also enjoyed a successful solo career and was briefly a member of the group Kansas in the mid-1980s.  Most recently, Morse became a member of the supergroup Flying Colors.

Biography

Early life
Steve Morse was born in Hamilton, Ohio. His family soon moved to Tennessee and then to Ypsilanti, Michigan, where Morse spent his childhood. Although familiar with piano and clarinet, Morse ultimately became a guitarist.

Morse worked briefly with his older brother Dave in a band called the Plague until the family moved to Augusta, Georgia. In the late 1960s, he played in a band called Three with his older brother and a junior high schoolmate, William Gerald (Jerry) Wooten, who played keyboards. The three performed at a local psychedelic youth club, the Glass Onion, and at Legion Halls and church functions.

While enrolled in the Academy of Richmond County, Morse met bassist Andy West and together they formed the Dixie Grit, adding keyboardist Johnny Carr and guitarist and vocalist Frank Brittingham, with Dave Morse drumming. This short-lived group played material from groups such as Led Zeppelin and Cream. West and Morse continued to play as a duet billed as the Dixie Dregs until Morse's expulsion from school in the 10th grade for refusing to cut his hair.

Education
Steve completed 11th grade at a local Catholic school and was eligible for early college enrollment. He enrolled at the University of Miami School of Music. 

During the 1970s, the University of Miami played host to a number of future influential musicians, including Bruce Hornsby, Pat Metheny, and Jaco Pastorius. Andy West also enrolled at the University of Miami, and with Morse, drummer Bart Yarnold, keyboardist Frank Josephs and violinist Allen Sloan, collaborated in a lab project entitled Rock Ensemble II. In 1975, the group compiled a recording used for promotional efforts. It was originally released on vinyl in 1976, and again on CD in 1997 as "The Great Spectacular."

From late 1987 to early 1988, Morse worked as a commercial airline co-pilot. He has lived in Ocala, Florida since 1991, where he is involved in hay farming.

Dixie Dregs 
Upon Morse's graduation from the University of Miami in 1975, he and West officially named their group Dixie Dregs. A fellow University of Miami alumnus, Rod Morgenstein, replaced the injured Bart Yarnold and the band began performing regularly; with some of their own compositions, along with material by John McLaughlin and southern rock favorites.  An increasingly heavier performance schedule eventually led to the attention of Capricorn Records recruiters including Allman Brothers Band manager Twiggs Lyndon, and in late 1976, the group was signed by the southern rock label.

Their first effort for Capricorn, Free Fall, established Morse as an important newcomer to the fusion genre, and he was recognized for both his compositional skills (having written all 11 tracks) and his musicianship. Although receiving positive reviews as a pivotal jazz fusion album, it sold poorly.

What If was released in 1978.  Writing credits were more collaborative and the band's sound had matured into more than what was strictly considered fusion at the time. Southern rock, classical, folk and country elements were combined to form a cohesive and listenable music. Though supported by a tour, record sales remained flat, but gained Morse and the band an invitation to perform at Montreux Jazz Festival on July 23, 1978. The recorded performance was released the following year on Night of the Living Dregs. Capricorn went bankrupt in late 1979, and the Dixie Dregs were left without a label.

Arista Records signed the band in 1979 to record three albums. Production control was handed to Morse, and Dregs of the Earth was released in May 1980. All eight tracks were written by Morse, and the album peaked at number 27 on Billboard's Jazz Album Chart.

Arista became increasingly concerned about Dixie Dregs' album sales and pressured the band to change their name to simply the Dregs in an attempt to increase the band's visibility in the public eye. Unsung Heroes included eight new Morse compositions in early 1981, but the name change did little to address Arista's worries. The Dregs felt compelled by label management to add lyrics to their next release, appropriately titled Industry Standard.

Morse's compositions on Industry Standard began to sound more like his evolving solo work than Dregs' collaborations, and the album received critical and public praise. Industry Standard was voted "Best Guitar LP" by readers of Guitar Player magazine in their annual reader's poll that year. Additionally, Morse was voted "Best Overall Guitarist" in the same poll, an honor that he would hold for five consecutive years (which ended his eligibility by retiring him into their "Gallery of Greats", a distinction shared only by Steve Howe of Yes and Eric Johnson). After fulfilling their commitment to Arista, the Dregs' members, who had tired of touring, disbanded in early 1983.

In the late 1980s, the group reunited for a tour featuring former members Morse, Morgenstein, Lavitz and Sloan. Their return was complemented by a "Best Of" release entitled Divided We Stand. Bassist Dave LaRue completed the lineup for a seven date tour culminating in the 1992 live album Bring 'em Back Alive. Violinist Jerry Goodman, of the Mahavishnu Orchestra fame, filled in for Sloan, who was frequently absent as a result of his medical career. They signed a deal with former label Capricorn Records for their first studio album in years entitled Full Circle in 1994.

Steve Morse Band and Kansas 
After the 1983 breakup of the Dregs, Morse then formed the Steve Morse Band, a trio with bassist Jerry Peek and drummer Doug Morgan (formerly a member of Glass Moon). After the first tour of the eastern United States, Morgan left for previous commitments; the choice to replace Morgan was Rod Morgenstein. They began recording The Introduction in September. The group toured Germany in early 1984 with Morse conducting clinics, and the group was signed by Elektra Records, who released The Introduction mid-year. A second German tour began in December 1984 and Stand Up was released in 1985. This effort included guest vocalists and guitarists (Eric Johnson, Alex Ligertwood, Peter Frampton, Albert Lee, Van Temple), and violinist Mark O'Connor. He toured with Rush as a main opener on their Power Windows tour.

In 1986, Morse joined the rock group Kansas. During his time with the band they released two albums, Power and In the Spirit of Things. While he was with the band, Kansas had its last big hit, "All I Wanted," which reached the Billboard Top 20 and on which Morse received co-writing credit. Morse left the band after touring behind the latter album. He re-joined the band for part of its 1991 tour.

Following this, Morse resumed the Steve Morse Band with new personnel (bassist Dave LaRue and drummer Van Romaine) and has released several further recordings, even after joining Deep Purple.

Deep Purple 
In 1994, Morse joined the British hard rock group Deep Purple, replacing Ritchie Blackmore (after Joe Satriani had initially replaced Blackmore on a temporary basis, for the final leg of The Battle Rages On tour in Japan, and European dates the following summer). With 28 years as a member of the band, Morse was their longest-serving guitarist and played on eight studio albums with them, between 1996's Purpendicular and 2021's Turning to Crime, and appeared on several live albums.

His departure from Deep Purple was announced on 23 July 2022, and driven by the illness of his wife Janine.

Living Loud 
In addition to playing with Deep Purple, Morse, together with Jimmy Barnes, Bob Daisley, Lee Kerslake and Don Airey, formed Living Loud in 2003. The group released one studio album and a live DVD in 2004/2005. In Spring 2010 it was reported that Steve Morse and Bob Daisley started work on a new studio album which was set for a release in 2011, but nothing came of this.

Angelfire 
Morse began a collaboration with singer Sarah Spencer in 2007 entitled Angelfire. The album, of the same name, was released on August 10, 2010, on Radiant Records. The album features Dave LaRue and Van Romaine of the Steve Morse Band on bass and drums, respectively. The album has a textural, acoustic sound that differs from Morse's previous work. Angelfire opened for the Steve Morse Band for several shows in California (January) and Florida (March) of 2010.

Flying Colors 
In 2011, Morse joined Flying Colors, an American supergroup composed of Mike Portnoy, Dave LaRue, Casey McPherson and Neal Morse, whose debut eponymous album was released on March 26, 2012, and debuted at No. 9 on Billboard's Hard Rock chart, and No. 11 on the BBC's Rock Album charts. Flying Colors released its second album, Second Nature, in 2014, and third album, Third Degree, in 2019, both to critical acclaim.

Influence and technique 
Morse is considered one of the hardest working guitarists in the world. He is widely known for his stylistically diverse compositional skills and was voted "Best Overall Guitarist" by Guitar Player magazine for five years in a row, qualifying him for its "Guitar Player Hall of Fame", the only other members being Steve Howe of Yes and Eric Johnson. He is regularly cited by John Petrucci as a major influence.  Guitarist Shawn Lane regarded Steve Morse as one of the most talented guitarists of his time. Ritchie Blackmore, who preceded Morse in Deep Purple, has stated, "Steve Morse is an incredible player. A lot of people try to get some wisecrack out of me, but when you're talking about guitar players along Morse's caliber, they're brilliant." Morse has proven himself throughout his career as capable of playing highly complex chord structures in classical sequences, as well as being able to play fast, alternate picked arpeggios. He is well known for using harmonics and improvising them in songs during live performances, such as in Deep Purple's "Sometimes I Feel Like Screaming".

Gear and equipment

Guitars 
Throughout the 1980s Morse was using a custom "Frankentele" guitar, made up of a Tele body with a Strat neck, a Gibson trapeze-style tailpiece (coming from a twelve string guitar) and four pickups in HSSH configuration. At one time, the guitar had a fifth pickup, a hexaphonic pickup with a separate output for each string; it provided the signal to drive a 360 Systems Spectre guitar synthesizer.

Morse worked with Music Man Guitars to create two signature models: a modernized version of Morse's first "Frankenstein Telecaster" guitar (Steve Morse Signature), and the Steve Morse SM Y-2D, is an updated version with quilted maple top.

Pickups
Morse has released two signature humbuckers with DiMarzio; the DP 205 Neck model and the DP 200 Bridge model. They are evenly balanced to allow playing all over the fretboard, since Morse plays high notes on the neck pickup and low ones on the bridge. They are the main pickups into his signature model. Dimarzio also wires a custom wound single coil pickup for Music Man to use into the SM signature model.

Amplification
Morse is an endorser of ENGL amps. He has released a signature model, the ENGL E-656 Steve Morse signature amplifier. It is a three channel amp specially designed by Morse with a custom version of the famous ENGL "midrange matrix". In the past he used Peavey 5150 amps with Deep Purple, Marshall Jubilee, Peavey VTM 120 and Ampeg V4.

Live setup
Morse's live equipment includes two ENGL E 656 Signature heads and several Music Man guitars (both models), his #1 still being his favorite. He splits up his signal to six different cabinets; four dry (without any FX) and two wet (with FX). He uses three Ernie Ball expression pedals to blend the fx into the mix. He uses a custom Skrydstrup R&D switching system to perform all the switching and the blending. His FX are very simple, consisting only of a Boss OC-3 Octaver and two delays: Electro-Harmonix Memory Man now replaced with the newest TC Electronic FlashBack TonePrint delay (Morse has created custom presets). He is also using a TC Electronic Polytune Mini guitar tuner.
His live setup for Deep Purple is discussed by him for Premier Guitar magazine's Rig Rundown.

Discography

With Dixie Dregs 
{| class="wikitable"
|+
!Date
!Title
!Type
!Notes
|-
|1976
|The Great Spectacular
|Studio
|self-released, re-released on CD in 1997
|-
|1977
|Free Fall
|Studio
|
|-
|1978
|What If
|Studio
|
|-
|1979
|Night Of The Living Dregs
|Studio
|
|-
|1980
|Dregs Of The Earth
|Studio
|
|-
|1981
|Unsung Heroes
|Studio
|
|-
|1982
|Industry Standard
|Studio
|
|-
|1988
|Off The Record
|Studio
|Demo for Ensoniq synthesizers
|-
|1992
|Bring 'Em Back Alive
|Live
|
|-
|1994
|Full Circle
|Studio
|
|-
|1997
|King Biscuit Flower Hour Presents Dixie Dregs
|Live
|Recorded on June 17, 1979
|-
|2000
|California Screamin'''
|Live
|
|-
|2005
|Live At Montreux 1978|Live
|DVD
|-
|2008
|Live In Connecticut 2001 (+ Cruise Control)
|Live
|CD / DVD
|-
|2015
|Wages Of Weirdness (CD)/Travel Tunes (download)
|Live
|1978 radio broadcast from KWFM in Tucson AZ, recorded at Lee Furr's Studios
|}

 With Deep Purple 

 Solo and with other bands 

 Guest appearances with other artists 
1977 Tropical Nights – Liza Minnelli
1979 Evening Pastoral – Rob Cassels Band
1980 Schemer-Dreamer – Steve Walsh (Guest electric guitar on Wait Until Tomorrow)
1981 I Wonder How Does Tarzan Shave/Cool In The Movies – Patrick Walsh
1982 Dixie Dregs demos – Fiona Flanagan (unreleased)
1983 Kamikazee Christian – Rob Cassels Band
1983 Art In America – Art in America
1983 The Touch- Sonny Turner
1986 Storytime – T Lavitz
1987 Stone From Which The Arch Was Made – Mark O'Connor
1987 Surveillance – Triumph (All the King's Horses and Headed for Nowhere)
1988 Southern By The Grace Of God: Lynyrd Skynyrd Tribute Tour 1987 – Lynyrd Skynyrd (Guitar on "Gimme Back My Bullets")
1988 Love Your Man – The Rossington Band
1990 Nashville Rendez-Vous – Marcel Dadi
1991 Fingers Crossing – Marcel Dadi
1992 Country Guitar Flavors – Marcel Dadi
1992 Lone Ranger – Jeff Watson (Guitar solo on Talking Hands)
1993 Coven, Pitrelli, O'Reilly – CPR
1994 Thonk – Michael Manring
1995 Carmine Appice's Guitar Zeus – Carmine Appice
1996 Dick Pimple Present Music From Turtle Island (Deep Purple in disguise)
1996 Signatures – Kevin Crider
1997 Storm – Torden & Lyn
2001 Seventh Key – Seventh Key (No Man's Land and Every Time It Rains)
2001 Nylon & Steel – Manuel Barrueco
2001 Feeding the Wheel – Jordan Rudess (Solos on Quantum Soup and Crack the Meter)
2001 Pavarotti & Friends For Afghanistan – Luciano Pavarotti (Smoke on the Water with Deep Purple)
2002 Camino Latino/Latin Journey – Liona Boyd
2004 Rhythm of Time – Jordan Rudess ("Bar Hopping with Mr. Picky" and "What Four")
2005 Guitar Farm – Steve Woolverton
2006 Gillan's Inn – Ian Gillan
2006 II – Deacon Street
2007 School of the Arts – School Of The Arts (On Fire and Portrait)
2008 Porta San Gennaro Napoli – Mario Fasciano / Rick Wakeman / Steve Morse / Ian Paice / Don Airey / Rob Townsend
2008 Brian Tarquin Presents... Fretworx – Brian Tarquin (on Towers)
2009 Trading 8s – Carl Verheyen Band (On Our Way)
2009 Classics Anthology – Rob Cassels Band
2011 Stay Tuned – Bernhard Welz
2011 Testimony 2 – Neal Morse (guitar solo on "Seeds Of Gold")
2011 Raised in Captivity – John Wetton (on Lost For Words)
2011 Guitar Passions – Sharon Isbin & friends
2011 Forth – Proto-Kaw
2012 A Proggy Christmas – The Prog World Orchestra
2012 The Fusion Syndicate – The Fusion Syndicate
2012 Concerto For Group And Orchestra – Jon Lord
2012 Great Gypsy Soul  – Tommy Bolin & Friends (On Crazed Fandango)
2013 Garrett vs. Paganini – David Garrett
2013 Epilogue – The Prog Collective
2014 Caprice- David Garrett
2014 Guitars For Wounded Warriors – Brian Tarquin & Heavy Friends (on Freedom)
2014 A Song For You (single) – Mario Fasciano / Charlie Cannon / Steve Morse
2015 tHis is the tHing #1 – Purpendicular
2015 Citizen- Billy Sherwood
2016 Don't You Tell Me Not To Play Guitar (single) – Dorian Chiiwahwah Phallic
2016 Stay Tuned 1.5 – Bernhard Welz
2017 Band Of Brothers – Brian Tarquin
2017 Part 1 – Chelsea Constable
2018 The Mutual Admiration Society – Sterling Ball, John Ferraro & Jim Cox
2018 Guitars For Veterans – Brian Tarquin & Heavy Friends
2018 Con Brio – Legacy Pilots
2018 Stay Tuned (new version) – Bernard Welz
2018 Triumphant Hearts – Jason Becker
2019 1000 Hands – Jon Anderson
2019 All Blues – Peter Frampton
2020 Vegas Blue - Brian Tarquin
2020 Sidemen – Sidemen
2020 Aviation – Legacy Pilots
2021 Not In Kansas Anymore - A Prog Opera - Robby Steinhardt

Various artists compilations and tributes 
1978 Hotels, Motels And Road Shows (various artists compilation)
1982 Radio 1 Rock Show themes (themes from English radio shows)
1985 Arista's Greatest AOR Hits: Portrait Of A Decade 1975–1985 (various artists compilation)
1989 Guitar's Practicing Musicians (various artists compilation)
1990 Ski Patrol (movie soundtrack)
1990 Metal Guitars (various artists compilation)
1991 Guitar's Practicing Musicians Vol. 2 (various artists compilation)
1991 Guitar Speak 3 (various artists compilation)
1992 Rock Guitar Greats (various artists compilation)
1992 Guitar On The Edge Vol. 2 (various artists compilation)
1992 Album Network Rock Tune Up 84 (various artists compilation)
1994 A Little On The CD Side Volume 14 (Musician magazine's new music sampler)
1994 Album Network Rock Tune Up 118 (various artists compilation)
1994 The Capricorn Sampler Volume One (various artists compilation)
1995 Tales From Yesterday (various artists tribute to Yes)
1995 A Little On The CD Side Volume 17 (Musician magazine's new music sampler)
1996 Crossfire – A Tribute To Stevie Ray (various artists tribute to Stevie Ray Vaughan)
1996 Working Man (various artists tribute to Rush)
1996 The Carols Of Christmas (various artist compilation)
1996 Animal Magnetism (various artists PETA benefit compilation)
1997 The Carols Of Christmas II (various artists compilation)
1997 Merry Axemas – A Guitar Christmas (various artists compilation)
1997 Jazz Fusion Vol. 2 (various artists compilation)
1997 aLIVE Down South (various artists Southern Rock compilation)
1997 Candlelight Moments: Dreamscape (various artists compilation)
1997 Healing Renew – Music in Harmony (various artists compilation)
1997 The Roots Of Rock: Southern Rock (various artists compilation)
1998 Guitar Battle (various artists compilation)
1998 The Show That Never Ends (various artists compilation)
1999 Legends Of Rock: The Progressive Rockers (various artists compilation)
1999 Tribute to the Titans (various artists compilation)
1999 Southern Rock Greats (various artists compilation)
1999 The Best Of Progressive Rock (various artists compilation)
1999 Rock Guitarists Forever Best (various artists compilation)
1999 Southern Rock Essentials (various artists compilation)
2001 Warmth In The Wilderness – A Tribute To Jason Becker (various artists tribute to Jason Becker)
2001 Sonic Residue From Vapourspace (Magna Carta remix album featuring the Morse song Led On)
2001 Guitar Heroes – Steve Morse Best (Dixie Dregs/Steve Morse Band/Kansas/Lynyrd Skynyrd/Deep Purple compilation)
2001 Audio's Audiophile Vol. 16: Rock And Grooves (various artists compilation)
2001 Unitone Guitar Series – A Portrait For Strings (various artists compilation)
2002 Southern Rock Christmas (various artists compilation)
2004 Classical Heartbreakers (various artists compilation)
2005 Visions of an Inner Mounting Apocalypse (various artists tribute to Mahavishnu Orchestra)
2005 Back Against The Wall (various artists tribute to Pink Floyd's The Wall)
2006 The Royal Dan: A Tribute (various artists instrumental guitar tribute to Steely Dan, featuring a different lead guitarist on 10 different songs)
2007 Freeway Jam – To Beck And Back – A Tribute (various artist tribute to Jeff Beck)
2008 This Is Fusion Guitar (various artists compilation)
2008 Led Box – The Ultimate Led Zeppelin Tribute (various artists tribute to Led Zeppelin)
2008 We Wish You A Metal Xmas And A Headbanging New Year (various artists compilation)
2009 Abbey Road – A Tribute To The Beatles (various artists tribute to The Beatles)
2009 An All-Star Salute To Christmas (various artists compilation)
2010 Tooth Fairy (movie soundtrack)
2012 Classic Rock Presents Prog – Prognosis 2.3 (various artists compilation)
2012 The Spirit Of Radio (various artists compilation)
2012 Songs Of The Century – An All-Star Tribute To Supertramp (various artists tribute to Supertramp)
2013 Fly Like An Eagle – An All-Star Tribute To Steve Miller Band (various artists tribute to Steve Miller Band)
2014 Midnight Rider – A Tribute To The Allman Brothers Band (various artists tribute to The Allman Brothers Band
2014 Light My Fire: A Classic Rock Salute to the Doors (various artists tribute to The Doors)
2015 The Classic Rock Society Presents… New Species Volume 21 (various artists compilation)
2015 Southern Rock Christmas (various artists compilation)
2016 Steve Morse – The Sessions (mp3 download compilation with tracks featuring Steve and various artists, which appeared on several different tribute albums before)
2018 Moore Blues For Gary – A Tribute To Gary Moore (various artists tribute to Gary Moore)

Other appearances 
1984 companion LP with Debüt magazine (Germany) February 1984
1993 Lexicon demonstration CD
1995 Free Wave Jam – Advance Micro Devices sound card promo CD with MIDI music files
1997 companion CD with Fingerstyle Guitar magazine #25 (with songs described in magazine)
1999 companion CD with Guitar Techniques magazine April 1999 (with songs described in magazine)

References

External links 

Official website
Steve Morse official Facebook page
Steve Morse interview by Innerviews (2020)
1978 Steve Morse interview by Jas Obrecht
Steve Morse interview by Goldmine magazine (2000)
Steve Morse interview by Music Recall Magazine (2014)
Steve Morse Interview for NAMM Oral History Program (2015)

1954 births
Academy of Richmond County alumni
American heavy metal guitarists
Deep Purple members
Dixie Dregs members
Guitarists from Michigan
Guitarists from Ohio
Kansas (band) members
Lead guitarists
Living people
People from Hamilton, Ohio
People from Ypsilanti, Michigan
Rhythm guitarists
University of Miami Frost School of Music alumni
20th-century American guitarists
Flying Colors (band) members
Living Loud members